This is a list of Minister for Ecclesiastical Affairs of Denmark since the establishment of the Ministry for Ecclesiastical Affairs in 1916.

List of Ministers for Ecclesiastical Affairs since 1916

|-
Office is assumed by the permanent secretary.

Notes

References
Tidligere kirkeministre. Ministry for Ecclesiastical Affairs of Denmark . Retrieved on 2007-11-25.

Ecclesiastical Affairs
 List